Bryum caespiticium is a species of moss belonging to the family Bryaceae.

It has almost cosmopolitan distribution.

Bryum caespiticium is known to be able to use artificial light to grow in places which are otherwise devoid of natural light, such as Crystal Cave in Wisconsin.

References

caespiticium
Taxa named by Johann Hedwig